Gilly Flower (26 August 1908 – 17 February 2001) was an English actress and model, best remembered as the elderly Miss Abitha Tibbs in the BBC sitcom Fawlty Towers.

Flower played Miss Tibbs in all twelve episodes of the show, which was produced in two six-episode series separated by a three-and-a-half-year interval.

A Londoner, Flower had her first film role in 1932 and, with the advent of television in Britain, she found a new outlet for her talents, continuing to appear in such programmes as Z-Cars, Steptoe and Son and The Fall and Rise of Reginald Perrin. Early in her career, Flower was also a model and seven portrait photographs taken by Bassano, in which she is modelling hats from Kembray, may today be found in the collection of the National Portrait Gallery.

Flower retired from acting in 1991.

Filmography

Film

Television

References

External links 

1908 births
2001 deaths
Actresses from London
English television actresses
English film actresses
British comedy actresses
20th-century English actresses
English female models
Models from London